Nesargi is a village in Belgaum district of Karnataka, India.Laxmi Bakery is situated in Nesargi, opposite the KSRTC busstand.

References

Villages in Belagavi district